The 1923 Chattanooga Moccasins football team was an American football team that represented the University of Chattanooga (now known as the University of Tennessee at Chattanooga) as a member of the Southern Intercollegiate Athletic Association (SIAA) during the 1923 college football season. In their second year under head coach Bill McAllester, the team compiled a 3–4–2 record.

Schedule

References

Chattanooga
Chattanooga Mocs football seasons
Chattanooga Moccasins football